Baert Lake is a small artificial lake in the unincorporated community of Christmas Valley in the U.S. state of Oregon. Managed by the Christmas Valley Park and Recreation District, the lake is used for fishing, boating, and swimming from spring through autumn and for ice skating in winter if the ice is thick enough.

An earlier name for the lake was Christmas Valley Lake. Part of the lake borders the Christmas Valley Golf Course.

See also 
 List of lakes in Oregon

References

Lakes of Lake County, Oregon
Reservoirs in Oregon